Maryse Martin (1906–1984) was a French singer, film and television actress.

Selected filmography

 Les Casse-pieds (1948)
 We Will All Go to Paris (1950) – Maman Terrine
 Musique en tête (1951) – La paysanne
 Paris Still Sings (1951) – La concierge
 Love Is Not a Sin (1952) – the concierge of the building
 Three Women (1952) – La mère Boitelle
 Le Curé de Saint-Amour (1952)
 Children of Love (1953) – Madeleine
 It's the Paris Life (1954) – Mlle Machu
 Leguignon the Healer (1954) – La cliente
 La Cage aux souris (1954) – Roquet
 Casse-cou, mademoiselle! (1955)
 Sophie et le Crime (1955) – La serveuse aux saucisses
 Les Premiers Outrages (1955) – Germaine – la femme de l'aubergiste
 On déménage le colonel (1955) – Mme Auguste – la fermière
 Maid in Paris (1956) – Germaine
 La Joyeuse Prison (1956) – Charlotte Tuboeuf
 Les Promesses dangereuses (1956)
 Mitsou ou Comment l'esprit vient aux filles (1956) – La concierge
 The Happy Road (1957) – The Mother
 L'amour descend du ciel (1957) – La tante de julien
 Bonjour jeunesse (1957)
 Bonjour Tristesse (1958) – (uncredited)
 L'École des cocottes (1958) – La patronne du 'Lapin du Morvan'
 La P... sentimentale (1958) – Solange – la prostituée au canard
 Minute papillon (1959)
 Le secret du Chevalier d'Éon (1959) – Georgette
 Marie of the Isles (1959) – Petit rôle (uncredited)
 Les Frangines (1960) – La directrice
 Boulevard (1960) – Mme Duriez
 Spotlight on a Murderer (1961) – Marthe
 La Traversée de la Loire (1962) 
 Jusqu'à plus soif (1962) – La mère Soulage
 Le Magot de Josefa (1963) – Maryse
 Monsieur (1964) – Jusine
 The Gorillas (1964) – La concierge (uncredited)
 Déclic et des claques (1965)
 Un garçon, une fille. Le dix-septième ciel (1966)
 Your Money or Your Life (1966) – La femme à la valise
 Sale temps pour les mouches (1966)
 Bye bye, Barbara (1969) – Habilleuse
 Le petit matin (1971) – Mélanie
 La coqueluche (1971)
 Le polygame (1974) – Mme La Cloche
 En grandes pompes (1974) 
 La Soupe froide (1975) – Veleda
 Rien ne va plus (1979) – Une paysanne

References

Bibliography
 Janis L. Pallister & Ruth A. Hottell. Francophone Women Film Directors: A Guide. Fairleigh Dickinson Univ Press, 2005.

External links

1906 births
1984 deaths
French film actresses
French television actresses
20th-century French actresses
Actresses from Paris
Singers from Paris
20th-century French women singers